The Eternal Reign is the second EP by American progressive metalcore band Born of Osiris. It is an entire re-recording of their 2007 EP, The New Reign, and includes one new song, "Glorious Day", originally intended for the 2007 release. An original, rough demo of that song can be found on the 2004 EP, Youm Wara Youm. The Eternal Reign was released on February 24, 2017 through Sumerian Records as a 10-year celebration of the release of The New Reign. This is the last album to feature bassist David Da Rocha.

Track listing

Personnel 
 Ronnie Canizaro - lead vocals
 Joe Buras - keyboards, backing vocals, synthesizer, programming, clean vocals on "Empires Erased"
 Lee McKinney - guitars
 David Darocha - bass
 Cameron Losch - drums

Production and recording
 Nick Sampson - engineering, mastering, mixing, producer
 Max Klein - assistant engineering

References 

2017 EPs
Born of Osiris albums
Sumerian Records albums